Gahnia howeana  is a flowering plant in the sedge family. The specific epithet refers to Lord Howe Island, where it is found. It was formerly lumped with Gahnia xanthocarpa, which is now considered to be endemic to New Zealand.

Description
It is a strong, tussocky perennial sedge with stout, smooth culms, growing to 1–2 m in height. The leaves are as long as the culms and about 1 cm wide at the base. It has a drooping, paniculate inflorescence, 30–40 cm in length.

Distribution and habitat
The sedge is endemic to Australia’s subtropical Lord Howe Island in the Tasman Sea. It occurs in moist areas within low forest on the rocky slopes and summits of Mounts Lidgbird and Gower at the southern end of the island.

References

howeana
Endemic flora of Lord Howe Island
Plants described in 1997
Poales of Australia